The Court and Society Review was a British literary magazine published between 1885 and 1888.

History and profile
Founded in July 1885 as The Court and Society Journal, the magazine changed its name to The Court and Society Review with its 1 October 1885 edition. It continued to publish weekly until its last issue on 6 June 1888.

The magazine is most notable for having published works by Oscar Wilde and Robert Louis Stevenson.

References

1888 disestablishments in the United Kingdom
Weekly magazines published in the United Kingdom
Defunct literary magazines published in the United Kingdom
Magazines established in 1885
Magazines disestablished in 1888
1885 establishments in the United Kingdom